Herbert Buckler (3 January 1878  – 23 January 1957) was a Welsh professional rugby league footballer who played in the 1900s. He played at representative level for Other Nationalities, and at club level for Salford, as a forward (prior to the specialist positions of), during the era of contested scrums.

Background
Herbert Buckler's birth was registered in Pontypool district, Wales, and his death aged 79 was registered in Cardiff district, Wales.

International honours
Herbert Buckler won a cap playing as a forward, i.e. number 12 for Other Nationalities in the 9-3 victory over England at Central Park, Wigan on Tuesday 5 April 1904, in the first ever international rugby league match.

Genealogical information
Herbert Buckler was the older brother of the rugby league footballer; Arthur Buckler.

References

1878 births
1957 deaths
Other Nationalities rugby league team players
Rugby league forwards
Rugby league players from Pontypool
Salford Red Devils players
Welsh rugby league players